Bernard Yves Raoul Dhéran (17 June 1926 – 27 January 2013) was a French actor, who was active in film, television and theatre in a career spanning over six decades. Dhéran was well remembered in French cinema's  as the French dub of David Niven, Anthony Hopkins, Christopher Plummer, Ian McKellen and Leslie Nielsen. He was also recognized in dubbing as the voice of Count Dooku in the animated series Star Wars: The Clone Wars, he also dubbed Christopher Lee's performance in Star Wars: Episode II – Attack of the Clones and Star Wars: Episode III – Revenge of the Sith.

In 1961, Dhéran was inducted into Sociétaires of the Comédie-Française.

He died at his home in Marrakech on the 27 January 2013, he had originally been commissioned to record his lines for Odin in the French dub of Thor: The Dark World, but due to his death Jean-Pierre Moulin (who is the official French dub of Hopkins) recorded the lines.

Selected filmography

 The Lame Devil (1948) - Un figurant (uncredited)
 Beauties of the Night (1952) - L'aviateur - Le fiancé de la caissière (uncredited)
 Royal Affairs in Versailles (1954) - Beaumarchais (uncredited)
 The Big Flag (1954)  - Lucien Barré
 Napoléon (1955) - Bourrienne (uncredited)
 Men in White (1955) - Clément
 The Grand Maneuver (1955) - Un officier (uncredited)
 If Paris Were Told to Us (1956) - Voltaire jeune
 If All the Guys in the World (1956) - Saint-Savin
 Ce soir les jupons volent (1956) - Bobby un amoureux de Marlène
 La garçonne (1957) - Max Delaume
 Miss Catastrophe (1957) - Fernand
 Le grand bluff (1957) - Serge Colonna
 L'inspecteur aime la bagarre (1957) - Barat
 Vacances explosives! (1957) - Monsieur Fred
 La peau de l'ours (1957) - Dr. Chauvin
 Quelle sacrée soirée (1957) - L'ami de Denise
 Fumée blonde (1957) - Bernard Hartman
 Vacanze a Ischia (1957) - Pierre Tissot
 It's All Adam's Fault (1958) - Le comte Philippe de Bergen
 Christine (1958) - Le captaine Lansky
 Douze heures d'horloge (1959) - Serge (voice)
 Soupe au lait (1959) - René Giquel - Le riche fiancé de Francine
 Rue des prairies (1959) - Le juge d'instruction Moineau
 Le Bossu (1959) - Narrator
 Magnificent Sinner (1959) - Stéphane Ryssakov
 Classe Tous Risques (1960) - Blastone (uncredited)
 Captain Blood (1960) - Récitant / Narrator (uncredited)
 Captain Fracasse (1961) - Chevalier de Vidalenc
 La Belle Américaine (1961) - M. Jean
 The Count of Monte Cristo (1961) - Le procureur Henri de Villefort
 Les Bricoleurs (1963) - L'inspecteur de l'auto-école
 Gibraltar (1964) - Harry Williams
 The Gorillas (1964) - Hubert Loisif
 On Murder Considered as One of the Fine Arts (1964) - Président des rédempteurs de l'assassinat
 Les Bons Vivants (1965) - L'avocat de la partie civile (Lucette) (segment 'Procès, Le")
 Une femme en blanc se révolte (1966) - Le brigadier de gendarmerie
 Le grand bidule (1967) - Morrisson
 L'homme à la Buick (1968) - Martel de la Mothe
 The Young Wolves (1968) - Jean-Noël
 Don't Deliver Us from Evil (1971) - L'automobiliste / Motorist
 Le silencieux (1973) - M.Chat
 Tarzoon: Shame of the Jungle (1975) - Récitant / Narrator (French version, voice)
 On a retrouvé la 7ème compagnie! (1975) - Colonel Voisin
 Les princes (1983) - Le mari de Jeanne
 Bernadette (1988) - Docteur Dozous / Doctor Dozous
 Sandino (1991) - Stimson
 Loulou Graffiti (1992) - Duplessis
 Ridicule (1996) - Montalieri
 Stardom (2000) - French Intellectual
 L'antidote (2005) - Salanches de Foiry
 Hunting and Gathering (2007) - Père de Philibert

French dubbing

Christopher Plummer's role in:
 Malcolm X
 Wolf
 Dolores Claiborne
 12 Monkeys
 A Beautiful Mind
 Nicholas Nickleby
 Syriana
 The New World
 Must Love Dogs
 Inside Man
 The Lake House
 The Imaginarium of Doctor Parnassus
 Beginners

Anthony Hopkins' role in:
 Howards End
 The Remains of the Day
 Shadowlands
 The Mask of Zorro
 Titus
 Mission: Impossible 2
 All the King's Men
 Bobby
 Thor

David Niven's role in:
 Bonjour Tristesse
 The Best of Enemies
 55 Days at Peking
 Murder by Death
 The Sea Wolves
 Rough Cut
 Trail of the Pink Panther

Ian McKellen's role in:
 X-Men
 X2
 X-Men: The Last Stand
 The Da Vinci Code

Leslie Nielsen's role in:
 Scary Movie 3
 Scary Movie 4
 Superhero Movie

Christopher Lee
 The Hound of the Baskervilles
 Star Wars: Episode II – Attack of the Clones
 Star Wars: Episode III – Revenge of the Sith
 Star Wars: The Clone Wars

References

External links
 

1926 births
2013 deaths
People from Dieppe, Seine-Maritime
French male film actors
French male television actors
French male voice actors
Sociétaires of the Comédie-Française
French male stage actors
French National Academy of Dramatic Arts alumni